Shaolin and Wu Tang is a 1983 Hong Kong martial arts film directed by and starring Gordon Liu. The film is about the rivalry between the Shaolin (East Asian Mahayana) and Wu-Tang (Taoist Religion) martial arts schools. It is also called Shaolin vs. Wu-Tang in the Master Killer Collection.

Plot summary

Master Liu and Master Law are rival masters of Shaolin style kung fu and Wu-Tang style sword fighting, running schools in the same city. Their top students, Chao Fung-wu (Adam Cheng) and Hung Jun-kit (Gordon Liu), are actually close friends, with Jun-kit's sister, Yan-ling (Idy Chan), having a crush on Fung-wu. After observing the two students fighting at a brothel, two of the local Qing Lord's (Johnny Wang) soldiers report the power of the styles to him. The Lord determines that the two styles are dangerous and that he must learn both.

After being poisoned by the Lord, Master Law lets Fung-wu stab him. For this, Fung-wu is sent to prison. Attempting to rescue Fung-wu, Jun-kit teaches a prisoner (Li Ching) the Shaolin Chin kang fist, not knowing the prisoner is the Lord's spy. After their escape from prison, the four of them (the spy, Yan-ling, Fung-wu and Jun-kit) are ambushed. To overcome the Lord's men, Fung-wu teaches the spy some Wu-Tang sword techniques. As they are still being overpowered, Fung-wu and Yan-ling have to flee the scene, only to be captured by the Wu-Tang who came to prosecute Fung-wu for killing Master Law. As they leave for Wu-Tang temple, Yan-ling gets shot and dies in Fung-wu arms. The Wu-Tang leave the dead body behind. Jun-kit finds it, believing the Wu-Tang killed his sister. Hoping to avenge Yan-ling's death, Jun-kit returns to the Shaolin temple for training as a monk. Meanwhile, Fung-wu is being held at the Wu-tang temple.

The Qing Lord has since learned both the styles from the spy, but because he did not learn either from a master, his grasp on both styles is imperfect. To overcome this deficiency, he decides to have the Wu-Tang and the Shaolin destroy each other so that he may be the only master of both styles. To do this, he stages a martial arts contest between the two temples, hoping to appeal to the traditional rivalry between the Shaolin and the Wu-Tang. Jun-kit (now called Tat-chi), and Fung-wu (now called Ming-kai), are selected by their respective temples as the representatives.

During the contest, the Qing Lord, in his impatience to see both Wu-Tang and Shaolin destroyed, admits his true motives and his role in Yan-ling and Master Law's deaths. Tat-chi and Ming-kai must then combine Shaolin Chin kang fist and Wu-Tang Sword style to defeat him.

Cast 
 Gordon Liu as Hung Jun-kit, later Tat-chi, Master Liu's top student
 Adam Cheng as Chao Fung-wu, later Ming-kai, Master Law's top student who is secret friends with Jun-kit
 Idy Chan as Yang-Lin, Jung-kit's sister who has a crush on Fung-wu
 Johnny Wang as the local Qing Lord who conspires against Master Liu and Master Law
 Li Ching as Yue Lam, the Qing Lord's spy learns the Shaolin and Wu-Tang styles from the Masters's disciples
 Chan Sen as a Shaolin abbot
 Han Chiang as Master Liu
 Kwan Hoi-san as Master Law, Master Liu's rival

Legacy
East Coast hip-hop group Wu-Tang Clan has cited the film as an early inspiration. The film is one of Wu-Tang Clan founder RZA's favorite films of all time.  Founders RZA and Ol' Dirty Bastard first saw the film in 1992 in a grindhouse cinema on Manhattan's 42nd Street and would found the group shortly after with GZA. The group would release its debut album Enter the Wu-Tang (36 Chambers), featuring samples from the film's English dub; the album's namesake is an amalgamation of Enter the Dragon (1973), Shaolin and Wu Tang, and The 36th Chamber of Shaolin (1978).

Rapper Logic samples the film in his song Wu Tang Forever from his YSIV album, which features all living Wu-Tang members at the time of its release.

References

External links

1983 films
1983 action films
1983 martial arts films
1980s Cantonese-language films
Films set in the Qing dynasty
Hong Kong action films
Hong Kong martial arts films
Kung fu films
Shaw Brothers Studio films
1980s Hong Kong films